Naser Al-Omran (born 3 March 1977) is a Kuwaiti former footballer. He competed in the men's tournament at the 2000 Summer Olympics.

References

External links
 
 
 

1977 births
Living people
Kuwaiti footballers
Kuwait international footballers
Olympic footballers of Kuwait
Footballers at the 2000 Summer Olympics
Place of birth missing (living people)
Association football midfielders
Asian Games medalists in football
Footballers at the 1998 Asian Games
Asian Games silver medalists for Kuwait
Medalists at the 1998 Asian Games
Kuwait Premier League players
Kazma SC players
Al-Sulaibikhat SC managers
Al Tadhamon SC players
Kuwaiti football managers